The Official Journal of the French Republic, also known as the JORF or JO, is the government gazette of the French Republic. It publishes the major legal official information from the national Government of France, the French Parliament and the French Constitutional Council.

Publications
The journal consists of several publications:
The best known is the "Laws and Decrees" (Journal officiel lois et décrets). It publishes all statutes and decrees, as well as some other administrative decisions. Statutes and decrees must be published in the Journal officiel before being binding on the French public
 The parliamentary debates (Senate, National Assembly, Economic, Social and Environmental Council)
 The Journal officiel Associations publishes notices of creations, breakup or substantial changes in nonprofit associations (according to the 1901 French law on associations)

Service
The direction of Official Gazettes (French: Direction des journaux officiels) is a service of the Prime Minister of France. It publishes the Journal officiel as well as other official gazettes publishing information from certain ministries or administrations. It is based at 26, rue Desaix (15th arrondissement of Paris).

Archives

Laws & Decrees

Parliamentary Debates

Other editions

See also

Government of France
Documentation française
Légifrance

References

External links
Official site

Government of France
France, Journal Officiel De La Republique
Judiciary of France
Parliamentary history of France